Thomas Peter Lantos (born Tamás Péter Lantos; February 1, 1928 – February 11, 2008) was a Holocaust survivor and American politician who served as a U.S. representative from California from 1981 until his death in 2008. A member of the Democratic Party, he represented the state's 11th congressional district until 1993, and from then the 12th congressional district, which both included the northern two-thirds of San Mateo County and a portion of the southwestern part of San Francisco after redistricting.

Lantos, who served as Chair of the House Foreign Affairs Committee in his last term, announced in early January 2008 that he would not run for re-election because of cancer of the esophagus. He died before finishing his term. A Hungarian Jew, Lantos was the only Holocaust survivor to have served in the United States Congress; he survived the genocide with help from Raoul Wallenberg. In speaking before the House of Representatives after his death, Speaker Nancy Pelosi stated that Lantos "devoted his public life to shining a bright light on the dark corners of oppression. He used his powerful voice to stir the consciousness of world leaders and the public alike." U2 lead singer Bono called him a "prizefighter", whose stamina would make him go "any amount of rounds, with anyone, anywhere, to protect human rights and common decency".

In 2008, after his death, the Congressional Human Rights Caucus, which he founded in 1983, was re-named the Tom Lantos Human Rights Commission. Its mission is partly "to promote, defend, and advocate internationally recognized human rights". In the final weeks of his life, Lantos asked that a non-profit be established to carry on the work he felt so passionately about. The Lantos Foundation for Human Rights & Justice was founded later that year to carry out that wish. In 2011, the Tom Lantos Institute was set up in Budapest to promote tolerance and support minority issues in Central Europe and Eastern Europe, as well as around the world.

Early years

World War II
Lantos was born Tamás Péter Lantos into a Jewish family in Budapest, Hungary, the son of Anna, a high school English teacher, and Pál Lantos, a banker. His family was heavily involved in education, and included an uncle who was a professor at the University of Budapest and a grandmother who was a high school principal. His life in Hungary would change after the "Third Reich" annexing of Austria in 1938, with the Austrian border just  from Budapest. Lantos remembered this period and a newspaper headline he read when he was ten years old, "Hitler Marches into Austria". Even at a young age, he understood the significance of this invasion:

I sensed that this historic moment would have a tremendous impact on the lives of Hungarian Jews, my family, and myself.

Six years later, in March 1944, the German military invaded Hungary and occupied Budapest, its capital. As he was Jewish, Lantos, then 16, was arrested and sent to a forced labor camp outside of Budapest. He escaped, but was soon caught by the Germans and beaten severely, then returned to the labor camp. There, he hid with an aunt in a safe house set up by Raoul Wallenberg, a Swedish diplomat.

Lantos joined Wallenberg's network; his fair hair and blue eyes, which to the Nazis were physical signs of "Aryanism", enabled him to serve as a courier and deliver food and medicine to Jews living in other safe houses. In January 1945, less than a year later, Russian military forces fought door-to-door battles and liberated Hungary from German occupation. However, Lantos, then 17, returned home only to discover that his mother and other family members had all been murdered by the Germans, along with 440,000 other Hungarian Jews, during the preceding 10 months of their occupation. Wallenberg, for his part, was later credited with saving the lives of thousands of other Hungarian Jews.

Lantos described some of his experiences in the Academy Award-winning documentary film The Last Days (1998), produced by Steven Spielberg's Shoah Foundation. In his floor speeches as a congressman, he sometimes referred to himself as one of the few living members of Congress who had fought against fascism. In 1981, Lantos sponsored a bill making Wallenberg an Honorary Citizen of the United States, and became a member of the International Raoul Wallenberg Foundation. In January 2006, he traveled to Hungary and attended a ceremony commemorating the 61st anniversary of the liberation of the Budapest Ghetto. The event was held at the Great Synagogue in Budapest, today the largest synagogue in Europe.

Education
In 1946, Lantos enrolled at the University of Budapest. As a result of his fluent English, he wrote an essay about Franklin D. Roosevelt, and he was awarded a scholarship by the Hillel Foundation to study in the United States. He then emigrated to the U.S., and studied economics at the University of Washington in Seattle, where he earned a B.A. in 1949 and an M.A. in 1950. He continued his post-graduate education at the University of California, Berkeley, and received a Ph.D. in economics in 1953.

Early career
After graduation from Berkeley, Lantos became a professor of economics at San Francisco State University. In subsequent years, he worked as a business consultant and television commentator on subjects of foreign policy. He eventually became a senior advisor to various U.S. Senators, and in 1980, he was elected to the U.S. Congress, where he remained until his death in February 2008. Recalling his early life, he announced his retirement by stating to Congress, "I will never be able to express fully my profoundly felt gratitude to this great country."

Personal and family life
Despite being fluent in English, Lantos never lost his Hungarian accent. During his childhood, he met his future wife, Annette Tillemann (or Tilleman; born June 27, 1931), then using the name Agnes Ethel Seymour. Her family had managed to escape to Switzerland, using Swedish passports issued by Raoul Wallenberg. After Hungary was liberated, she and her family returned to Budapest, where she and Lantos met again. After emigrating to the United States, they married on July 13, 1950. They remained married until his death in 2008. Agnes Ethel Lantos became a naturalized United States citizen on May 17, 1954, under that name. Annette (formerly Agnes) Lantos is a niece of Jolie Gabor, whose brother Sebastian was Mrs. Lantos's father, making Magda, Zsa Zsa, and Eva Gabor, Jolie's daughters, first cousins to Annette Lantos.

Lantos and his wife had two daughters, Annette Marie and Katrina, and 18 grandchildren, including Levi, an author and energy expert; Tomicah, a former Democratic political speechwriter; and Charity, an opera singer and activist. The Lantoses' daughter Annette was married to Timber Dick, an independent businessman in Colorado, until his accidental death in 2008.

Lantos's younger daughter, Katrina, is married to ambassador and former U.S. Representative from New Hampshire, Richard Swett, and was herself a candidate for Congress in New Hampshire. Lantos considered himself a secular Jew.

Political career and positions
Lantos made his first run for office in 1980, challenging Republican Congressman Bill Royer, who had won a 1979 special election after Democrat Leo Ryan was killed in the Jonestown massacre. Lantos defeated Royer by 5,700 votes. He never again faced such a close contest, and was re-elected 13 times. Lantos earned a reputation as a champion for various human rights causes, such as having Yahoo CEO Jerry Yang testify at a congressional hearing, when the company turned over the email records of two Chinese dissidents to the Chinese government, allowing them to be traced and one sentenced to jail.

Lantos was a member of the Congressional Progressive Caucus, and repeatedly called for reforms to the nation's health-care system, reduction of the national budget deficit and the national debt, repeal of the Economic Growth and Tax Relief Reconciliation Act of 2001. He opposed Social Security privatization efforts. He supported same-sex marriage rights and marijuana for medical use, was a strong proponent of gun control and adamantly pro-choice.

Lantos was an advocate on behalf of the environment, receiving consistently high ratings from the League of Conservation Voters and other environmental organizations for his legislative record. His long-standing efforts to protect open space brought thousands of acres under the protection of the Golden Gate National Recreation Area, including Mori Point, Sweeney Ridge, and Rancho Corral de Tierra, which will keep its watersheds and delicate habitats free from development permanently. 

While Lantos initially supported the Iraq War, from 2006 onward he distanced himself, making increasingly critical statements about the conduct of the war.

Foreign affairs issues

Lantos served as the chairman of the United States House Committee on Foreign Affairs. Through its more than 20 years of work, the Congressional Human Rights Caucus—of which Lantos was co-chair with Representative Frank Wolf—covered a wide range of human rights issues. They included speaking for Christians in Saudi Arabia and Sudan to practice their faith, helping Tibetans to retain their culture and religion in Tibet, and advocating for other minorities worldwide.

Among his other efforts was a demand that Japan apologize for sex slavery during World War II. He declared Turkey's mass killings of Armenians during World War I to be genocide. In more recent times, he supported democracy in Burma and pressed for sanctions on Iran for supporting terrorism. In 2004, he sponsored a bill to stop the spread of anti-semitism.

On other aspects of American foreign policy, Lantos spoke out against waste, fraud and abuse in the multi-billion dollar U.S. reconstruction program in Iraq, and warned that the U.S. could lose Afghanistan to the Taliban if the Bush administration failed to take decisive action to halt the current decline in political stability there. Lantos was against U.S. military aid to Egypt as the Egyptian military had failed to stop the flow of money and weapons across the Egyptian border to Hamas in Gaza, and Egypt had not contributed troops to the peacekeeping efforts in Afghanistan and elsewhere.

1991 Gulf War

Lantos was a strong supporter of the 1991 Persian Gulf War. During the run-up to the war, the Congressional Human Rights Caucus, of which Lantos was co-chairman, hosted a young Kuwaiti woman identified only as "Nurse Nayirah", who told of horrific abuses by Iraqi soldiers, including the killing of Kuwaiti babies by taking them out of their incubators and leaving them to die on the cold floor of the hospital. These alleged atrocities figured prominently in the rhetoric at the time about Iraqi abuses in Kuwait. The girl's account was later challenged by independent human rights monitors.

"Nurse Nayirah" later turned out to be the daughter of the Kuwaiti ambassador to the United States. Asked about having allowed the girl to give testimony without identifying herself, and without her story having been corroborated, Lantos replied, "The notion that any of the witnesses brought to the caucus through the Kuwaiti Embassy would not be credible did not cross my mind... I have no basis for assuming that her story is not true, but the point goes beyond that. If one hypothesizes that the woman's story is fictitious from A to Z, that in no way diminishes the avalanche of human rights violations."

The Canadian Broadcasting Corporation sent investigators to Kuwait who went through the hospital and counted the incubators and they found that "except for one or two that may have been misplaced" all of the incubators were still in the hospital. The investigators concluded that there were no deaths resulting from stolen equipment. And the doctor who provided Amnesty International with the number of babies killed dropped from 312 to 72 and then 30, 19 of which died before the invasion of Kuwait by Iraq. After the war, The New York Times wrote, "It's plainly wrong for a member of congress to collaborate with a public relations firm to produce knowingly deceptive testimony on an important issue. Yet Representative Tom Lantos has been caught doing exactly that. His behavior warrants a searching inquiry by the House Ethics Committee."

War in Iraq
On October 4, 2002, Lantos led a narrow majority of Democrats on the House International Relations Committee to a successful vote in support of the Resolution for the Use of Force, seeking the approval of the United Nations and under the condition that President George W. Bush would allow UN weapons inspectors to finish their work and that Bush would need to return to Congress for an actual declaration of war before invading Iraq. The resolution later passed the House and the Senate with a total of 373 members of Congress supporting it. "The train is now on its way", said Lantos after the resolution successfully passed both houses of Congress. In later hearings on the war, Lantos continued his enthusiastic support.

Starting in early 2006, Lantos distanced himself from the Bush Administration's Iraq policy, making critical statements at hearings, on the House floor and in published media interviews about the conduct of the war. During hearings of the House International Relations Committee, where he was then the ranking member, Lantos repeatedly praised the investigative work of the office of the Special Inspector of Iraq Reconstruction General Stuart Bowen, which uncovered evidence of waste, fraud and abuse in the use of U.S. taxpayer dollars intended to help secure and rebuild Iraq. Lantos was an immediate and consistent critic of the troop surge advocated by President Bush. On the night in January 2007 that Bush announced his plan, Lantos responded, "I oppose the so-called surge that constitutes the centerpiece of the President's plan. Our efforts in Iraq are a mess, and throwing in more troops will not improve it."

During a joint House hearing on September 10, 2007, featuring General David Petraeus and Ambassador Ryan Crocker, Lantos said:

At the same hearing, Lantos drew comparisons between some of the current U.S. activities in Iraq to U.S. support two decades earlier of Islamic militants in Afghanistan:

Human rights advocate

Tibet
As co-founder of the Congressional Human Rights Caucus in 1983 and as Chairman of the Foreign Affairs Committee, Lantos would "stir the consciousness of world leaders and the public alike", according to Representative Nancy Pelosi. She added: "Wherever there was injustice or oppression, he used his expertise and moral authority to put the United States on the side of justice and human rights". In 2007, in his effort to help the people of China and Tibet, he presented the Dalai Lama with the Congressional Gold Medal.

Darfur
On April 28, 2006, Lantos and four other Democratic U.S. Representatives, along with six other activists, took part in a civil disobedience action in front of the Sudanese embassy in Washington, D.C. They were protesting the role of the Sudanese government in carrying out genocide in the Darfur conflict and were arrested for disorderly conduct.

Hungarian minorities
Lantos was an activist for the rights of Hungarian minorities; as a member of the US House of Representatives. In a 2007 letter he asked Robert Fico, the Prime Minister of Slovakia to distance themselves from the Beneš decrees, a reasonable process in the Hedvig Malina case, and to treat members of the Hungarian minority as equal.

The American Hungarian Federation recognized Congressman Lantos for his "Leadership in Support of Democracy, Human Rights and Minority Rights in Central and Eastern Europe", awarding him the organization's highest award, the "Col. Commandant Michael Kovats Medal of Freedom", at the October 19, 2005, Congressional Reception commemorating the 49th Anniversary of the 1956 Hungarian Revolution.

Lebanon
On August 27, 2006, at the Israeli Foreign Ministry building in Israel, Lantos said he would block a foreign aid package promised by President George W. Bush to Lebanon unless and until Beirut agreed to the deployment of international troops on the border with Syria and Lebanon takes control of its borders with Syria to prevent arms smuggling to Hezbollah guerrillas.

Morocco and Western Sahara
Lantos supported Morocco's demand to gain sovereignty over Western Sahara, and criticized the Polisario Front, which demands independence for the disputed region. In 2007, he backed Morocco's proposal to make the region autonomous under Moroccan rule, saying: "I urge the leadership of the Polisario to realize that they will never again get such a good deal for the population they purport to represent."

Death and legacy

On January 2, 2008, after having been diagnosed with esophageal cancer, Lantos announced he would not run for a 15th term in the House, but planned to complete his final term, and thanked Congress:

Lantos died of complications from esophageal cancer on February 11, 2008, before finishing his term. A special election was held to fill his seat on April 8, 2008, and was won by former State Senator Jackie Speier, whom Lantos had endorsed. Shortly after his death, Roy Blunt, the House Republican Whip, stated that "Chairman Lantos will be remembered as a man of uncommon integrity and sincere moral conviction — and a public servant who never wavered in his pursuit of a better, freer and more religiously tolerant world."

A memorial service was held for Lantos on February 14, 2008, at Statuary Hall in the Capitol. Speakers included Senator Joe Biden, Bono of U2, Rep. Steny Hoyer, UN Secretary General Ban Ki-moon, Israeli foreign minister Tzipi Livni, Speaker Nancy Pelosi, Secretary of State Condoleezza Rice, Rep. Christopher Shays and Elie Wiesel.

He was buried in Congressional Cemetery in Washington, D.C.

On June 19, 2008, President George W. Bush posthumously awarded Lantos the Medal of Freedom. In a ceremony at the White House, Bush stated "We miss his vigorous defense of human rights and his powerful witness for the cause of human freedom. For a lifetime of leadership, for his commitment to liberty, and for his devoted service to his adopted nation, I am proud to award the Presidential Medal of Freedom, posthumously, to Tom Lantos, and proud that his loving wife Annette will receive the award on behalf of his family."

In 2008, the Congressional Human Rights Caucus, which he founded in 1983, was renamed The Tom Lantos Human Rights Commission. Its mission is partly "to promote, defend and advocate internationally recognized human rights." The first Lantos Human Rights Prize, named in the congressman's memory, was presented to the 14th Dalai Lama in 2009. In 2011, the institute was set up in Budapest to promote tolerance and support minority issues in central and eastern Europe and in the world.

In the final weeks of his life, Lantos asked that a non-profit be established to carry on the work he felt so passionately about. The Lantos Foundation for Human Rights & Justice was founded later that year to carry out that wish. Lantos's daughter, Katrina Lantos Swett, serves as the Foundation's president and CEO.

On September 10, 2011, the Peninsula Humane Society & SPCA officially opened the Tom and Annette Lantos Center for Compassion, located at 1450 Rollins Road in Burlingame, California. The facility was funded with a naming gift in the Lantos's honor by Oracle founder, Larry Ellison, and his wife, Melanie.

 Tom Lantos Tunnels south of San Francisco have been named after the late Congressman, as has a street in Netanya, Israel.
 BBYO, Inc. (formerly B'nai B'rith Youth Organization) chapter honored Tom Lantos's legacy by naming the chapter in his honor. Lantos AZA #2539 now thrives in the Rockville, Maryland, area.

Budapest named a promenade in the city in honor of Lantos in 2016.

Lantos received the Grand Cross, Hungary's highest civilian honor.

Congressional scorecards
See also [all links dead]

Project Vote Smart provides the following results from congressional scorecards.

American Civil Liberties Union – 91% for 2005–2006
Americans for Democratic Action – 100% for 2006
American Land Rights Association – 9% for 2006
Americans for Tax Reform – 0% for 2006
Animal Welfare Institute Compassion Index – 100% for 2007
AFL–CIO – 100% in 2006
Campaign for America's Future – 100% for 2005–2006
Conservative Index (John Birch Society) – 11% for fall 2004
Children's Defense Fund – 100% for 2006
Drug Policy Alliance – 83% for 2006
Drum Major Institute – 100% for 2005
Family Research Council – 0% for 2006
FreedomWorks – 0% for 2006
Gun Owners of America – 0% for 2006
Humane Society of the United States – 100% for 2005–2006
League of Conservation Voters – 92% for 2006
NARAL Pro-Choice America – 100% for 2006
National Association of Wheat Growers – 37% for 2005
National Education Association – 100% for 2005–2006
National Federation of Independent Business – 14% for 2005–2006
National Journal – Composite liberal score of 86.2% for 2006
National Organization for the Reform of Marijuana Laws – 20 for 2006
National Organization for Women – 95% for 2005–2006
National Rifle Association – F for 2006
National Right to Life Committee – 0% for 2005–2006
National Taxpayers Union – 10% for 2006
Population Connection – 100% for 2006
Republican Liberty Caucus – 16% for 2005
Secular Coalition for America – 70% on 2006 scorecards
United States Chamber of Commerce – 33% for 2006

Controversies
During a 1996 congressional inquiry into the Filegate scandal, Lantos told witness Craig Livingstone that "with an infinitely more distinguished public record than yours, Admiral Boorda committed suicide when he may have committed a minor mistake". Boorda, the Chief of Naval Operations, had taken his own life after his right to wear Combat V decorations had been questioned. Lantos was criticized by some (including fellow Congressman Joe Scarborough) for this comment.

On May 3, 2000, Lantos was involved in an automobile accident while driving on Capitol Hill. He drove over a young boy's foot and then failed to stop his vehicle and was later fined over the incident for inattentive driving.

In 2002, Lantos, who was on the House Committee on International Affairs, took Colette Avital, a Labor Party member of the Israeli Knesset, by the hand and, according to Haaretz, tried to reassure her with these words: "My dear Colette, don't worry. You won't have any problem with Saddam. We'll be rid of the bastard soon enough. And in his place we'll install a pro-Western dictator, who will be good for us and for you." He later denied saying this, but Avital confirmed it, according to Ben Terrall, an adviser to Maad H. Abu-Ghazalah, a Libertarian Party candidate who ran against Lantos that year.

In June 2007, Lantos called former German Chancellor Gerhard Schröder a "political prostitute" at the dedication ceremony of the Victims of Communism Memorial, which caused a political backlash from the German government. Lantos was referring to Schröder's ties to energy business in Russia, and remarked that this appellation would offend prostitutes.

In October 2007, Dutch parliament members said Lantos insulted them while discussing the War on Terror by stating that the Netherlands had to help the United States because it liberated them in World War II, while adding that "Europe was not as outraged by Auschwitz as by Guantanamo Bay."

On January 6, 2008, FBI whistleblower Sibel Edmonds included Lantos's photograph among others featured in the "State Secrets Privilege Gallery" posted on her website, composing images of figures considered to be relevant to her case. On August 8, 2009, she gave sworn testimony about Lantos and others during a witness deposition before the Ohio Elections Commission in the Schmidt v. Krikorian case, in which she alleged that he had engaged in "[N]ot only ... bribe[ry], but also ... disclosing highest level protected U.S. intelligence and weapons technology information both to Israel and to Turkey. ... other very serious criminal conduct."

Electoral history

*Write-in and minor candidate notes: In 1980, Nicholas W. Kudrovzeff, American Independent Party, received 1,550 votes (1%). In 1982, Nicholas W. Kudrovzeff, American Independent Party, received 1,250 votes (1%). In 1988, Nicholas W. Kudrovzeff, American Independent Party, received 1,893 votes (1%).

See also

 List of Jewish members of the United States Congress
 List of United States Congress members who died in office

References

External links

 Freedom of Information request on death threats against Tom Lantos.
, video, Associated Press News, February 11, 2008
Congressional hearings 15 video clips

Lantos set to retire after 27 years in public office, Canadian Hungarian Journal
Finding Aid to the Tom Lantos Papers, 1944-2008, The Bancroft Library

|-

|-

|-

|-

|-

|-

1928 births
2008 deaths
20th-century American politicians
21st-century American politicians
American human rights activists
American people of Hungarian-Jewish descent
American political activists
American political consultants
American political commentators
American Zionists
Deaths from cancer in Maryland
Deaths from esophageal cancer
Hungarian emigrants to the United States
Hungarian Jews
Jewish activists
Jewish American people in California politics
Jewish members of the United States House of Representatives
Democratic Party members of the United States House of Representatives from California
Jewish concentration camp survivors
People with acquired American citizenship
Politicians from Budapest
People from Burlingame, California
Presidential Medal of Freedom recipients
San Francisco State University faculty
Secular Jews
Tibet freedom activists
University of Washington College of Arts and Sciences alumni
University of California, Berkeley alumni
Hungarian World War II forced labourers
20th-century American Jews
21st-century American Jews